Republic of Korea Army Armor School is a college located in Jangseong, South Korea.

References

Training establishments of the South Korean Army
Universities and colleges in South Jeolla Province
Educational institutions established in 1950
1950 establishments in South Korea